Aashish Rakesh Kapoor (born 25 March 1971) is a former Indian cricketer who played in four Test matches and 17 One Day Internationals from 1994 to 2000. A right-arm off spinner and right-handed lower-order batsman, he was a member of the 1996 Cricket World Cup squad.

Kapoor began his playing career at the St Mary's School and Santhome HSS in Chennai. In the TNCA schools tournament in 1987–88, he scored four hundreds in a row, including a 116 before lunch against Padma Seshadri. This won him the Best Schoolboy Cricketer award from TNCA and later the JC Mukherjee award for the best U-17 cricketer. For South Zone in the Vijay Hazare Trophy, Kapoor scored 103 & 58* against Central Zone and 130 against the North. He then started playing for SPIC in the senior league.

In December 1988 in the Under-19 Ghulam Ahmed trophy (South Zone of the Cooch Behar Trophy), Kapoor scored 304 (420 minutes, 354 balls, 24 fours and a six) against Goa. He added 408 for the first wicket with J. Ramdas. He also coached for Baharain cricket team.

References

Living people
1971 births
Indian cricketers
India One Day International cricketers
India Test cricketers
Cricketers at the 1996 Cricket World Cup
North Zone cricketers
Himachal Pradesh cricketers
Punjab, India cricketers
Rajasthan cricketers
Tamil Nadu cricketers
Tripura cricketers
South Zone cricketers